The John L. Callahan House is located in La Crosse, Wisconsin.

History
John L. Callahan was a physician and a local health official. Callahan used the house as his residence and his office. Later, it was used as a funeral parlor before being converted into apartments. It was added to the State and the National Register of Historic Places in 1995.

References

Houses on the National Register of Historic Places in Wisconsin
Office buildings on the National Register of Historic Places in Wisconsin
National Register of Historic Places in La Crosse County, Wisconsin
Houses in La Crosse County, Wisconsin
Buildings and structures in La Crosse, Wisconsin
Queen Anne architecture in Wisconsin
Houses completed in 1894